Chunta (Aymara for  prolonged, lengthened, Quechua for a kind of palm, Hispanicized name La Chonta) is a  mountain in the Andes of Peru. It is located in the Junín Region, Yauli Province, Marcapomacocha District, and in the Lima Region, Canta Province, Huaros District, and in the Huarochirí Province, Huanza District. It lies northwest of Kashpi.

References

Mountains of Peru
Mountains of Lima Region
Mountains of Junín Region